Show Me the Body is an American hardcore punk band from New York. Their sound draws heavily on hip hop, noise music and sludge metal. Their debut album, Body War, was released in 2016.

History

2009–13: Early years 
Julian Pratt first conceived of an early version of Show Me the Body after meeting Harlan Steed in ninth grade at Elisabeth Irwin High School. Julian became increasingly engrossed in the New York hardcore music scene when he volunteered at the Lower Eastside's ABC No Rio social space, a venue that hosts daytime punk shows on Saturdays. They bonded over playing music with Pratt's cousin, their former drummer and eventual in-house producer, Gabriel Millman. They officially became Show Me the Body around a year after meeting. As a way to get up close and personal with fans, instead of clubs, their first shows were played under bridge overpasses, alleys, and in basements.

2014–15: Debut EPs 
In 2014, formed the musical collective Letter Racer with their classmates in the group Ratking and toured with them that summer. That July saw the release of their debut EP, Yellow Kidney, independently released on SoundCloud. Their release caught the attention of record label Loma Vista which facilitated the subsequent release of their self-titled EP S M T B in April 2015. By then the band had added Noah Cohen-Corbett as drummer.

2016–17: Body War and the CORPUS collective 
Their debut album, Body War, was released in July 2016. The album touches on themes such as anti-capitalism, gentrification and police brutality through a wide range of experimental sounds. Their collective, CORPUS, released their compilation mixtape Corpus I in March 2017.

2018–19: Dog Whistle 
While on tour in Poland, the band visited the Auschwitz-Birkenau Memorial and Museum. This trip served as the influence for their third record, Dog Whistle, released on March 29, 2019. The album was written in Long Island City, and recorded in Los Angeles California the previous summer.

2020–present: Survive and Trouble the Water 
Because of the COVID-19 pandemic, Show Me the Body "had to reconfigure" how they "interact with" their fans. Their reliance on live performances made this difficult, but they opted to establish a new studio space for their CORPUS collective and recorded an EP, titled Survive, which was released in March 2021. The short EP deals with themes of isolation. During this time, the band brought on current drummer Jackie Jackieboy.

Artistry 
Although primarily punk rock oriented, Show Me the Body combines the sounds and techniques of alternative hip hop, sludge metal, and noise music in order to craft an abrasive style. Their conventional instruments, such as Pratt's banjo and Steed's bass, are accompanied by an array of effects units and computer programming that form the characteristic distortion that features in much of their music. Pratt's eclectic vocal style paired with Cohen-Corbett's, and later McDermott's, aggressive drumming help complete and add weight to the band's grunge-influenced compositions.

Discography

Studio albums

Mixtapes

Extended plays

Singles

Band members

Current members
Julian Cashwan Pratt – vocals, banjo , programming , guitar, synthesizer 
Harlan Steed – bass guitar , synthesizer , programming, samples , baritone guitar 
Jack McDermott (Jackie Jackieboy) – drums, percussion

Former members
Noah Cohen-Corbett – drums, percussion, programming 
Gabriel Millman – programming, samples , drums, percussion

Timeline

Collaborators 
Show Me the Body's notable collaborators include, but are not limited to, Denzel Curry, Princess Nokia, Dreamcrusher, Wiki, Mal Devisa, and Ratking. They have toured with King Krule, Daughters, and HEALTH.

References

External links
 Official Bandcamp page
 YouTube
 CORPUS SoundCloud
 Official merchandise <--- CURRENTLY BROKEN

Hip hop groups from New York City
Hardcore punk groups from New York (state)
2012 establishments in New York (state)
Musical groups established in 2012